Eric Guy Chouinard (born July 8, 1980) is an American-born Canadian former professional ice hockey player who played in the National Hockey League (NHL) with the Montreal Canadiens, Philadelphia Flyers and Minnesota Wild.

Playing career
Chouinard was born in Atlanta during his father's days with the Atlanta Flames, but raised in Cap-Rouge, Quebec. As a youth, he played in the 1993 Quebec International Pee-Wee Hockey Tournament with a minor ice hockey team from Sherbrooke.

Chouinard has played for Team Canada in international competition despite getting offers to play for Team USA. After scoring 296 points in 180 games with the Quebec Remparts of the Quebec Major Junior Hockey League, he became a 1st-round draft choice (16th overall) by the Montreal Canadiens in the 1998 NHL Entry Draft. Since then, he has also played for the Philadelphia Flyers and the Minnesota Wild, where he played alongside his cousin, Marc Chouinard, during the 2003–04 season.

In 2006–2007, Chouinard played four games in Switzerland for HC Sierre-Anniviers. He received an offer to play for the Straubing Tigers of the German DEL where he played until January 19, 2009 when he was suspended by the team.

On September 2, 2009 Chouinard signed a contract with the Nurnberg Ice Tigers of the Deutsche Eishockey Liga. On January 15, 2011, he signed a new two-year contract extension with the Ice Tigers that will take him through the 2012–2013 season.

Approaching his final professional years, Chouinard played three seasons with Brûleurs de Loups of the French Ligue Magnus before ending his career by returning to Germany for a single season in 2017–18 with the Bayreuth Tigers of the DEL2.

Personal life
Chouinard is the son of former Atlanta Flames star Guy Chouinard, and the cousin of Marc Chouinard.

Career statistics

Regular season and playoffs

International

Awards and honours

See also
 Notable families in the NHL

References

External links
 

1980 births
American emigrants to Canada
EHC Bayreuth players
Brûleurs de Loups players
Canadian ice hockey centres
HC Dinamo Minsk players
Fredericton Canadiens players
Ice hockey people from Georgia (U.S. state)
Ice hockey people from Quebec City
Laval Titan Collège Français players
Living people
Minnesota Wild players
Montreal Canadiens draft picks
Montreal Canadiens players
National Hockey League first-round draft picks
Philadelphia Flyers players
Philadelphia Phantoms players
Phoenix Coyotes players
Sportspeople from Atlanta
Quebec Citadelles players
Quebec Remparts players
San Antonio Rampage players
Straubing Tigers players
Thomas Sabo Ice Tigers players
Utah Grizzlies (AHL) players
Vålerenga Ishockey players
Canadian expatriate ice hockey players in Belarus
Canadian expatriate ice hockey players in Norway
Canadian expatriate ice hockey players in Germany